Forecasting complexity is a measure of complexity put forward (under the original name of) by the physicist Peter Grassberger.

It was later renamed "statistical complexity" by James P. Crutchfield and Karl Young.

References 

Measures of complexity